Mullanpur may refer to:
 Mullanpur Dakha, Ludhiana district, India
 New Chandigarh or Mullanpur, Sahibzada Ajit Singh Nagar district, India